Metin Toy (born 3 May 1994) is a Turkish male volleyball player. He is part of the Turkey men's national volleyball team. On club level he plays for Fenerbahçe.

References

External links
Profile at FIVB.org

1994 births
Living people
Turkish men's volleyball players
People from Kütahya
Fenerbahçe volleyballers
Competitors at the 2018 Mediterranean Games
Mediterranean Games competitors for Turkey
21st-century Turkish people